Madarellus cuneatus is a species of flower weevil in the family Curculionidae. It is found in North America.

References

Further reading

 
 
 
 

Baridinae
Beetles described in 1893